Human rights in East Pakistan is about human rights in East Pakistan before its independence and the creation of Bangladesh.

Language movement 
The Bengali language movement began in 1948 after the independence of Pakistan. The Bengalis demanded Bengali be made a national language of Pakistan, while Pakistani national leaders only wanted Urdu to be the national language. On 21 February 1952 the police in East Pakistan fired in a crowd of peaceful demonstrators, killing four people. The next day Pakistan army and police attacked demonstrations again resulting in a number of death and injuries.

Religious minorities 
The government and military elites of Pakistan viewed the Hindu minority in East Pakistan as a fifth column. They blamed the Hindus for the economic backwardness of East Pakistan. The 1970 election held under the joint electorate only got to minority member elected to the National assembly. During the Bangladesh liberation war Hindus were targeted by Pakistan Army and Biharis supporting them. The bank accounts of Hindus were frozen.

LGBT rights 
LGBT relationships were illegal under the former British colonial laws which banned "unnatural sex".

Bangladesh liberation war

Genocide 
The genocide refers to the selective mass killing in East Pakistan by Pakistani security establishment during the Bangladesh Liberation War. The University of Dhaka was attacked with tanks resulting in the death of students and staff. Newspaper offices and Hindu neighborhoods were shelled by Pakistan Army in Dhaka.

Killings of intellectuals 
The Pakistan security forces tried to eliminate Bengali nationalism through the killing of Bengali intellectuals. It resulted in the killing of over a thousand intellectuals including doctors, educationists, lawyers, engineers, etc. On 14 December 1971, two days before the surrender of Pakistan, 200 intellectuals were abducted from their home and killed.

References 

History of East Pakistan
Human rights in Bangladesh
War crimes in Bangladesh